Bréguet–Sabin is a station of the Paris Métro, serving line 5, located in the 11th arrondissement of Paris.

Location
The station is located under the Boulevard Richard-Lenoir, along the covered Canal Saint-Martin, close to Rue Bréguet and Rue Saint-Sabin, between the Richard-Lenoir and Bastille metro stations.

History
The station name pays tribute to the Breguet family, including the Swiss-born watchmaker Abraham Breguet (1747–1823), who invented watches with automatic winding for astronomy. His grandson Louis Breguet (1804–1883) invented electrical and radio-telegraphic apparatus and collaborated with Claude Chappe. Later, his great-grandson Antoine (1851–1882) developed an electric anemometer. The sons of the latter, pioneers of aviation, Jacques and the famous Louis Charles Breguet (1880–1955) were the builders of the aircraft piloted by Dieudonné Costes and Maurice Bellonte who crossed the Atlantic from east to west in 1930. The name of the station is also a tribute to Angelesme de Saint-Sabin who was city councillor of Paris in 1777. The station was open on December 31, 1906.

The station saw 2,351,237 passengers enter it in 2018, placing it in 233rd position out of 302 metro stations.

Services for passengers

Access
The station has two entrances with stairs leading to each end of the platform, located on Boulevard Richard-Lenoir.
 access 1 – cnr.  21 Boulevard Richard-Lenoir / Rue Saint-Sabin, its entrance ironwork decorated by Hector Guimard;
 access 2 – cnr. 9 Boulevard Richard-Lenoir / Rue de Pasteur Wagner, has a simple decoration in the same style.

Station layout

Platforms
Breguet–Sabin is a standard configuration station. It has two platforms separated by the metro tracks. The ceiling consists of a metal deck, whose silver beams, are supported by vertical walls. The platforms are in the Andreu-Motte style with a yellow luminous rail and yellow Motte seats. The spandrels and walls have flat white tiles aligned and placed vertically. The advertising frames are metallic and the name of the station is in Parisine typeface on enamelled plates.

Bus connections
The station is served by line 69 of the RATP Bus Network.

Gallery

References

Roland, Gérard (2003). Stations de métro. D’Abbesses à Wagram. Éditions Bonneton.

Paris Métro stations in the 11th arrondissement of Paris
Railway stations in France opened in 1906